Shahid Chamran Metro Station is a station on Isfahan Metro Line 1, Iran. The station opened on 2 November 2016. It is located at Kaveh Boulevard south of Chamran Bridge (intersecting Chamran Expwy. and Radanipur Expwy.) in Isfahan. The next station on the north side is Kaveh Station at Kaveh Bus Terminal and on the south side Shahid Bahonar Station.

References

Isfahan Metro stations
Railway stations opened in 2016
2016 establishments in Iran